Forest Hills High School may refer to one of the following schools.

Forest Hills High School (New York) in Queens, New York
Forest Hills High School (Maine) in Jackman, Maine
Forest Hills High School, Marshville, North Carolina
Forest Hills High School (Pennsylvania) in Sidman, Pennsylvania
Forest Hill Community High School in West Palm Beach, Florida; previously known as Forest Hills High School
Forest Hill Collegiate Institute, a high school in Toronto

See also
Forest Hill High School in Jackson, Mississippi
Foresthill High School, Foresthill High, California